Samut Sakhon is one of the central provinces (changwat) of Thailand, established by the Act Establishing Changwat Samut Prakan, Changwat Nonthaburi, Changwat Samut Sakhon, and Changwat Nakhon Nayok, Buddhist Era 2489 (1946), which came into force on 9 May 1946.

Neighboring provinces are (from the southwest clockwise) Samut Songkhram, Ratchaburi, Nakhon Pathom, and Bangkok. Samut Sakhon is part of the Bangkok Metropolitan Region.

Toponymy
The word samut originates from the Sanskrit word samudra meaning 'ocean', and the word sakhon from Sanskrit sagara meaning 'lake'.

Geography
Samut Sakhon is at the mouth of the Tha Chin Klong River, a distributary of the Chao Phraya River, to the Gulf of Thailand. At the coast are many salt pans used for harvesting sea salt.

Climate
Samut Sakhon province has a tropical savanna climate (Köppen climate classification category Aw). Winters are dry and warm. Temperatures rise until May. The monsoon season runs from May through October, with heavy rain and somewhat cooler temperatures during the day, although nights remain warm. Climatological data for the period 1981–2010: Maximum temperature is 39.7 °C (103.5 °F) in April and May and the lowest temperature is 12.0 °C (53.6 °F) in December. The highest average temperature is 35.4 °C (95.7 °F) in April and the minimum average temperature is 22.0 °C (71.6 °F) in December. Mean annual rainfall is 1648 millimeters. The maximum daily rainfall is 248 millimeters in May. Mean rainy days average 130 days per year.

History
The oldest name of the area is Tha Chin ('Chinese pier'), probably referring to the fact that it was a trading port where Chinese junks arrived. In 1548 the city Sakhon Buri was established, and was renamed Mahachai in 1704 after the Khlong Mahachai which was dug then and connected with the Tha Chin River near the town. King Mongkut gave it its current name, but the old name Mahachai is still sometimes used by locals.

Economy and environment
Formerly an agricultural- and fisheries-based province, Samut Sakhon in 2020 has more than 6,000 factories, most of them small, employing fewer than 50 workers, and too small to warrant much attention from Thailand's Pollution Control Department (PCD). Small firms lack the budgets to install the environmental gear that would help protect the environment. As a result, Samut Sakhon is one of the most polluted provinces in the nation.

Soil and water samples from the industrial area of Mueang District were found to be contaminated with high levels of arsenic, lead, cadmium, chromium, zinc, copper, and nickel. High levels of persistent organic pollutants (POPS), byproducts of industrial processes, were present in eggs from free-range chickens. An egg tested by researchers was found to have 84 nanograms per kilogram of dioxins and furans, a level 33 times higher than the safety limit observed by the European Union.

The most polluted air in Thailand in 2018 was found to be in Samut Sakhon province. According to the PCD, the level of PM2.5 in the provincial atmosphere in 2019 was unusually high, measuring as high as 195 micrograms per cubic metre (μg/m3). During the air pollution "season" of 2018–2019, PM2.5 levels exceeded the PCD's safe threshold of 50 μg/m3 for 41 days.

Samut Sakhon is a leading sea salt producer. According to a survey in 2011, 12,572 rai of salt pans were managed by 242 families in Samut Sakhon.

Health 
Samut Sakhon Hospital is the main hospital of Samut Sakhon province, operated by the Ministry of Public Health.

Symbols

The provincial seal shows a Chinese junk in front of the coast, with a factory and a smoking chimney in the background. Both refer to the old trading tradition as well as the local industries.

The provincial flag is horizontally divided pink/light blue/pink (1:3:1) the provincial seal in the middle.

The provincial brand is a picture of a white factory, a fishing boat, a fish and blue water and a green leaf.

The provincial tree is commonly called blackboard tree or devil's tree (Alstonia scholaris). 

The provincial aquatic animal is Pholas orientalis, a bivalve that found in the Gulf of Thailand and Tha Chin estuary especially in the area of the province.

The provincial slogan is "Fishing city, factory town, agricultural ground, historic site".

Administrative divisions

Provincial government
The province is divided into three districts (amphoes). The districts are further subdivided into 40 subdistricts (tambons) and 290 villages (mubans).
Mueang Samut Sakhon
Krathum Baen
Ban Phaeo.

Local government
As of 19 December 2019 there are: one Samut Sakhon Provincial Administrative Organization (PAO) and fifteen municipal (thesaban) areas in the province. The capital Samut Sakhon and Om Noi have city (thesaban nakhon) status. Two have town (thesaban mueang) status and eleven are subdistrict municipalities (thesaban tambon).

The non-municipal areas are administered by 22 Subdistrict Administrative
Organizations (SAO) (ongkan borihan suan tambon).

Human achievement index 2017

Since 2003, United Nations Development Programme (UNDP) in Thailand has tracked progress on human development at sub-national level using the Human achievement index (HAI), a composite index covering all the eight key areas of human development. National Economic and Social Development Board (NESDB) has taken over this task since 2017.

References

External links

 Samut Sakhon provincial map, coat of arms, and postal stamp

 
Provinces of Thailand
Gulf of Thailand